Daucosma is a genus of flowering plants belonging to the family Apiaceae.

Its native range is Texas.

Species:
 Daucosma laciniata Engelm. & A.Gray

References

Apioideae
Apioideae genera